Stylianos Harkianakis (29 December 1935 – 25 March 2019) was the Greek Orthodox Archbishop of Australia and Primate of the Greek Orthodox Archdiocese of Australia. He served as inaugural and permanent Chairman of the Standing Conference of Canonical Orthodox Churches in Australia and Dean of St Andrew's Greek Orthodox Theological College. He was a theologian specialising in ecclesiology and also an award-winning poet.

Overview
Stylianos Harkianakis was born in Rethymno on the island of Crete, Greece, on 29 December 1935. He studied theology at the Theological School of Halki on the island of Halki and graduated in 1958. He was ordained a deacon in 1957 and a priest in 1958. He completed postgraduate studies in systematic theology and the philosophy of religion at the University of Bonn in West Germany from 1958 to 1966. His lecturers included Joseph Ratzinger, who later became Pope Benedict XVI. He wrote his thesis on the concept that the Orthodox Church possessed infallibility when it acted together in conciliarity (e.g. the Ecumenical Councils). At that time, the idea of infallibility was thought to be an exclusively Roman Catholic idea, entirely alien to the Orthodox Church.

In 1965, whilst still completing his postgraduate studies, Harkianakis was appointed Professor of Theology at the University of Athens. In 1966, he was appointed abbot of the Holy Patriarchal Monastery of Vlatodon, in Thessaloniki. He was a founding member, then became vice-president and later president, of the Patriarchal Institute of Patristic Studies within the monastery. From 1969 to 1975, he lectured in systematic theology at the University of Thessaloniki.

In 1970, Harkianakis was elected the Titular Metropolitan of Militoupolis (whilst remaining in the Holy Monastery of Vlatadon) as exarch in matters concerning Northern Greece and Mount Athos.

Archbishop of Australia
On 3 February 1975, Harkianakis was elected Archbishop of Australia and Exarch of Oceania. He arrived in Sydney on 15 April and was enthroned on 26 April (Saturday of Lazarus). In this role, he engaged in many dialogues between Orthodoxy and other Christian groups, most prominently as co-chairman of the theological dialogue with the Roman Catholic Church, but also as co-chairman of the dialogue with the Anglican churches.

Harkianakis taught Orthodox theology and spirituality at Sydney University from 1975. In 1986 he  became the inaugural dean of St Andrew's Theological College where he also served as Lecturer in Systematic Theology. 

Harkianakis was the plaintiff in a defamation suit against journalist Theo Skalkos and a contempt case for articles published by Skalkos which were said to amount to public vilification to deter Harkianakis from continuing to bring defamation suits. 

Harkianakis died following a lengthy illness in Sydney on 25 March 2019, on the Holy Day of the Annunciation of the Theotokos.

Awards
In 1973, Harkianakis was awarded the International Award Gottfried von Herder. A noted poet with an extensive bibliography, he was given the Award for Poetry from the Academy of Athens in 1980. In 1985 he received an honorary doctorate from Lublin University, Poland. One of his poems, "After Ephialtes", was set to music by Costas Tsicaderis.

References

Bibliography
 

1935 births
2019 deaths
Greek emigrants to Australia
People from Rethymno
20th-century Eastern Orthodox bishops
21st-century Eastern Orthodox bishops
Eastern Orthodox archbishops in Australia
Religious leaders from Crete
Theological School of Halki alumni
20th-century Eastern Orthodox archbishops
Herder Prize recipients
Greek expatriate bishops
University of Bonn alumni
Academic staff of the National and Kapodistrian University of Athens
Academic staff of the Aristotle University of Thessaloniki
20th-century Greek poets
21st-century Greek poets